Women of Honor is a term used by Ring of Honor (ROH) to refer to its women's division and to the promotion's female talent. The term is applied universally to wrestlers, backstage interviewers, and managers/valets.

History of women in Ring of Honor

Early years and partnership with Shimmer (2002–2011) 
ROH had its first women's match on June 22, 2002, at its Road to the Title show; it saw Sumie Sakai defeat Simply Luscious. Women's wrestling was sporadically featured in ROH since the match. During the 2000s, ROH featured female wrestlers like Sara Del Rey, Daizee Haze, Serena Deeb, Mercedes Martinez and others on shows, later releasing a DVD featuring the best of its women's division. Some of women's matches were also featured on ROH's television program on HDNet but ROH did not consistently feature women's matches until 2015.

ROH also had a partnership with women's professional wrestling promotion Shimmer Women Athletes, with the Shimmer Championship and Shimmer Tag Team Championship being defended on several ROH shows – becoming the first women's titles to be featured in ROH.

End of partnership with Shimmer (2011–2015) 
From 2011 to 2015, ROH's female talent consisted primary of female valets and interviewers. Though some female wrestlers would compete in the promotion, notably Sara Del Ray, Allysin Kay, Jenny Rose, Leah Von Dutch, Athena Reese, Maria Kanellis, Scarlett Bordeaux, Mandy Leon, Mia Yim, Cherry Bomb, MsChif, Barbi Hayden, Taeler Hendrix, Seleziya Sparx, and Veda Scott. On February 23, 2011, at ROH 9th Anniversary Show, Sara Del Ray defeated Mschif.

During those years Maria Kanellis went on to manage (valet) her husband Mike Bennett and his tag team partner Matt Taven as The Kingdom the stable went on to feud with and against great talent such as Jay Lethal and other great male talent of the ROH roster during that time. Somewhere after that Maria Kanelis was attacked by Lisa Marie Varon while valeting and following after the attack had a one-on-one feud match against Lisa Marie Varon at an indy Pay-per-view event for an indy Women's Championship which she was victorious at winning.
 

Also during that time other ROH Girls such as Sara Del Ray, Allysin Kay, Jenny Rose, Athena Reese, Scarlett Bordeaux, Mandy Leon, Mia Yim, Cherry Bomb, MsChif, Barbi Hayden, Taeler Hendrix, Seleziya, and Veda Scott spent there time wrestling in rare once in a life time rarely seen especially on Television ROH Women of Honor matches and in mix tag team matches against each other, interviewing talent, interviewing backstage talent, ring announcing, side ring bell ringing and Managing and Valeting male talent of the company.

For example on August 15, 2014 at ROH Field of Honor of 2014 Jay Lethal defeated Matt Taven for the ROH World Television Championship with Seleziya aka Seleziya Sparxs and Truth Martini in Jay Lethals conor. Seleziya was Jay Lethals female valet alongside his then male valet Truth Martini. During sometime Taeler Hendrix was also Jay Lethals female valet but the two ladies never at the same time valeted Jay Lethal.

 
Another factual example during year 2011 Mia Yim was introduced to Ring of Honor Wrestling by Prince Nana as Princess Mia Yim after that from that point on she went on to valet his male stable alliance alongside him at Ring of Honor. She also had a match against Sara Del Ray in Ring of Honor Wrestling but was not successful.

For a third factual example During year 2013 Athena Reese was a part of a ROH stable by the name of Team RnB alongside another ROH wrestler by the name of A. C. H. weeks later A.C.H. ran into another ROH wrestler by the name of TaDarius Thomas and then the two made an alliance tag team stable name by the name of Adrenaline RUSH that primarily consisted of A.C.H. and TaDarius Thomas only from that point on.
 
After that the three also had a six-mix tag team match against MsChif, B. J. Whitmer, and Michael Elgin but were not successful.

Rebuilding the women's division (2015–2016) 
The popularity of women in Ring of Honor has resulted in Ring of Honor taping a pilot for a standalone Women of Honor program. Ring of Honor has also made numerous Women of Honor branded merchandise available for purchase. The pilot aired as a Women of Honor-branded television special the weekend of June 25, 2016 and its success led to a Women of Honor taping that is available on DVD.

Women of Honor (2016–present) 
At its founding, ROH had a partnership with the female exclusive promotion Shimmer Women Athletes (Shimmer), with their top championship - the Shimmer Championship - being defended at ROH events, essentially serving as ROH's de facto women's title in the promotion's early years.

Currently, Ring of Honor regularly airs and promotes their Women Division Wednesday matches formerly known as Women of Honor Wednesday matches on their YouTube, Facebook, and Twitter platforms. As of June 2018, the only two videos to receive 3 million or more views on Ring of Honor's YouTube page are Women of Honor matches, both featuring former Women of Honor World Champion, "The Gatekeeper" Kelly Klein.

Matches are called and presented by Ian Riccaboni. He has been joined by Taeler Hendrix, Mandy Leon, Veda Scott, Matt Taven and B. J. Whitmer for YouTube exclusives and Nigel McGuinness for the two Women of Honor television specials. Along with Sakai, there has been four champions shared between Angelina Love, Mayu Iwatani and Klein, who held the title in a  record setting three-time.

In February 2017, ROH partnered with Japanese promotion World Wonder Ring Stardom for a Women of Honor tryout camp. On December 5, at Final Battle, Riccaboni introduced the new Women of Honor Championship, which would later be named the Women of Honor World Championship, as a tournament for the championship was set to start on January 20, 2018. On April 7, at Supercard of Honor XII, Sumie Sakai defeated Kelly Klein in the tournament final to become the inaugural champion. Along with Sakai, there have been four champions overall, shared between Angelina Love, Mayu Iwatani and Klein, who held the title in a record setting three-time.

On January 1, 2020, ROH deactivated the Women of Honor World Champion, held at the time by Kelly Klein, due to the former champion deciding not to renew her contract with the promotion amidst disagreements between the two parties, leading into Klein filling a lawsuit against the company over a year later in early 2021. As such, a new championship was to be created for the division, the ROH Women's World Championship. The winner was originally planned to be crowned in a 16-woman Tournament at Quest For Gold, but that tournament, as well as the Women of Honor division as a whole, was put on hold due to the event being cancelled amidst the COVID-19 pandemic.

During the ROH 19th Anniversary Show  on March 26, 2021, Maria Kanellis made her on-screen return to the promotion and announced a new tournament to crown a new ROH Women's World Champion, the first since the retirement of the Women of Honor World Championship at the beginning of 2020. The tournament will take place in summer 2021, with a number of the matches to be showcased on ROH TV. The division also seemingly dropped using the 'Women of Honor' name as a month later, 'Women's Division Wednesdays' returned on ROH's official YouTube channel starting on April 28, 2021.

On December 15, 2017, ROH announced the creation of its own women's title - the ROH Women of Honor World Championship, with Sumie Sakai becoming the first title holder at Supercard of Honor XII on April 7, 2018, defeating Kelly Klein in the finals of the tournament to crown the inaugural champion.

As of January 1, 2020, ROH deactivated the ROH Women of Honor World Championship (due to contractual issues with reigning champion Kelly Klein), and announced the creation of a brand new championship for the division, the ROH Women's World Championship. The winner was originally planned to be crowned in a 16-woman Tournament at Quest For Gold, but had been cancelled due to the COVID-19 pandemic.  After ROH resumed operations following a five-month pandemic related hiatus, a new 15-woman tournament (with one participant - Angelina Love - getting a first round bye due to Vita VonStarr being removed from the tournament via other personal issues with Maria Kanellis) was announced at Best in the World that took place beginning on July 31, 2021, and tournament final which Rok-C won to become the inaugural ROH Women's World Champion on September 12, 2021 at Death Before Dishonor XVIII.

Championships and accomplishments

Current championships

Past championships

Women of Honor's Year–End Awards

Women of Honor tournaments

Inaugural Women of Honor Championship tournament 
 Qualifying matches 
 Ring of Honor Wrestling tapings – June 29 and June 30 (2300 Arena – Philadelphia, Pennsylvania)

 Tournament bracket

Inaugural ROH Women's World Championship tournament

Pro Wrestling Illustrated

PWI Female 50 / Female 100

See also
Women in WWE
Impact Knockouts

References

External links 
 ROH official website

Professional wrestling slang
Ring of Honor
Women's professional wrestling
Women's professional wrestling shows